Mirit I. Aladjem is an Israeli-American biologist researching cellular signaling pathways that regulate DNA synthesis. She is a senior investigator in the National Cancer Institute's developmental therapeutics branch and head of the DNA replication group.

Education 
Aladjem completed a Ph.D. at Tel Aviv University. She was a research associate at the Weizmann Institute of Science and then a postdoctoral fellow and a Leukemia Society Special Fellow at the Salk Institute for Biological Studies.

Career and research 

Aladjem joined the National Cancer Institute's Laboratory of Molecular Pharmacology/Developmental Therapeutics Branch in October 1999 and was appointed a senior investigator in 2007. Aladjem's studies focus on cellular signaling pathways that modulate chromatin to regulate chromosome duplication and cell cycle progression. Aladjem’s team was the first to map replication origins on a whole genome scale, demonstrating a strong association between replication, histone modifications and chromatin packaging. Her current studies identified proteins that dictate whether particular chromatin regions would replicate during normal growth and after exposure to anti-cancer therapy.

References

External links
 
 
LinkedIn

Living people
Year of birth missing (living people)
Place of birth missing (living people)
Israeli women scientists
Israeli biologists
21st-century American women scientists
21st-century American biologists
American women biologists
Tel Aviv University alumni
Israeli emigrants to the United States
National Institutes of Health people
American medical researchers
Women medical researchers